Schneidheimer Sechta is a river of Baden-Württemberg, Germany. It passes through Unterschneidheim and flows into the Eger in Bopfingen.

See also
List of rivers of Baden-Württemberg

References

Rivers of Baden-Württemberg
Rivers of Germany